Friedrich Gottlieb Bartling (December 9, 1798 – November 20, 1875) was a German botanist who was a native of Hanover.

He studied natural sciences at the University of Göttingen, and in 1818 took a botanical journey through Hungary and Croatia. In 1822 he became a lecturer at Göttingen, where he later became a professor. In 1837 he was appointed director of its botanical garden.

The plant genus Bartlingia from the family Rubiaceae is named in his honor.

Selected publications 
 De litoribus ac insulis maris Liburnici (1820). 
 Ordines naturales plantarum (1830). 
 Flora der österreichischen Küstenländer, (Flora of the Austrian coastal area), (1825).                
 Vegetabilia cellularia in Germania septentrionali praesertim in Hercynia et in agro Gottingensi lecta (1834 and 1836), with Georg Ernst Ludwig Hampe (1795–1880).

References 

 Parts of this article are based on a translation of an equivalent article at the German Wikipedia.

19th-century German botanists
Scientists from Hanover
Academic staff of the University of Göttingen
1798 births
1875 deaths
Members of the German Academy of Sciences Leopoldina
Members of the Göttingen Academy of Sciences and Humanities